Article 365 of the Sri Lankan Penal Code, which dates from the time of colonial British Ceylon, criminalizes sexual acts deemed "against the order of nature". This has been ruled unenforceable by the Supreme Court, but the court does not have the power to remove laws outright. A private members' bill submitted to parliament in August 2022 has been given the support of the ruling government and is likely to be passed by parliament in 2023.

Transgenders can legally change gender following medical approval and surgical intervention is not required. In 2016 the Government of Sri Lanka launched Gender Recognition Certificates and provided clear guidelines to medical workers on how to positively deal with the transgender community.

There are no anti-discrimination laws, but the government has stated that discrimination based on sexuality and gender is implicitly banned under the existing constitution, and it has proposed to provide anti-discrimination laws as part of a wider constitutional overhaul currently under negotiation.

Background 

The current legal framework of Sri Lanka, mostly derives from European-Christian constructs as they stood during the colonial era, and were imported into the island. It is predominantly British law with some earlier colonial Roman-Dutch law. The most prominent of the discriminatory laws is the now seemingly dormant (sometimes reported as "decriminalized") Section 365, that criminalizes homosexual sex.  Further problems with the colonial legal framework include the lack of protections and supports for the sexual minority community, including the lack of specific wording fighting discrimination against sexual minorities nor the recognition of transgender and third gender concepts (who have been technically discriminated against through the Vargrants Ordinance). The Supreme Court and the various governments of Sri Lanka have countered this situation by including sexual minorities within generic anti-discrimination clauses and attempting to set dormant a variety of laws (though the colonial legal code does not provide the Supreme Court with the power to create or repeal law).

Human rights organizations have reported that police and government workers used the threat of arrest to assault, harass, and sexually and monetarily extort LGBTQI individuals. Intimidation and  harassment, including death threats, and physical and sexual assaults are directed at sexual minorities by both official and private actors. Cruel and degrading treatment, amounting to torture, emotional or psychological abuse, is perpetrated by means such as involuntary institutionalisation or during police investigations. For example, individuals may be forced to undergo anal or vaginal examinations as part of a police prosecution, or be detained in psychiatric facilities for involuntary "treatment".

Political and community attitudes  
The political parties of Sri Lanka are formed through collations of numerous smaller parties reminiscent of the party politics in former colonial power Netherlands, and hence confusion and constant movement can be found in terms of their stances to homosexuality. Both the conservative government of Srisena and the socialist government of Rajapaska have stated that discrimination against sexual minorities is unconstitutional and that Section 365 cannot be legally applied to consensual homosexual sex, but in contradiction to this the socialist collation refused to allow the conservative government's attempted deletion of Section 365 from legal texts. A number of non-governmental organizations, lawmakers and religious organizations have come out in favor of sexual minorities, and openly homosexual gay and transgender lawmakers can be found in the parliament and the government. A variety of public institutions including the health service and the police have been introducing internal commitments to improve living conditions for sexual minorities.

Sri Lankan societies generally takes a modestly unobtrusive and traditionalist view of homosexuality and certain traditions exist for the promotion of transgenders (albeit third gender appears to have escaped the island despite it having roots historically within Sri Lankan culture) and consequently these laws have mostly been applied loosely (if ever) and discrimination by police (and the like) is often associated with corruption or attitudes towards sexual promiscuity which are applied to heterosexuals as well. A number of issues remain untouched by general discussion including that of the status of sexual minorities within the military service, and intersex rights have mostly escaped both mainstream discussion and discussion by LGBT lobbies. Other laws and legalities that can negatively affect sexual minorities are more widely discussion in the Sexual minorities in Sri Lanka article.

In 1994, Sherman de Rose set up Companions on a Journey (CoJ), the first LGBT support group in Sri Lanka. The Women's Support Group split off from CoJ in 1999, forming a separate organisation for lesbian, bisexual and transgender women. Equal Ground was then set up as an LGBTI group.

  The influential Buddhist chapter, Asgiriya Chapter, came out in support of extending rights to LGBT, including support to amend the constitution.

In March 2021, in order to commemorate Zero Discrimination Day, the President of Sri Lanka Gotabaya Rajapaksa tweeted "As the president of #lka I am determined to secure everybody's right to live life with dignity regardless of age, gender, sexuality, race, physical appearance, and beliefs." The Financial Times opinioned that this was the first public acknowledgement by the South Asian Head of State about everyone's right not to be discriminated on their sexuality or gender.

In August 2021, after a video of a homophobic counsellor caused controversy on the internet, the College of Psychiatrists clarified that modern medicine does not consider homosexuality to be an illness and further called for homosexuality to be decriminalized; unlike psychiatrists, counsellors are not regulated and do not require degrees.

Legality of same-sex sexual acts
Article 365 of the Sri Lankan Penal Code, which dates from the time of colonial British Ceylon, criminalizes sexual acts deemed "against the order of nature". For much of the law's history, the prohibition applied to only to males; in 1995, Article 365 was amended to replace the word "males" with "persons" so that same-sex sexual activity between consenting adult females was also outlawed in addition to that between consenting adult males. This has been ruled unenforcable by the Supreme Court, but the court does not have the power to remove laws outright.

Ordinance to Provide a General Penal Code for Ceylon 1883 

Sections 365 and 365A of the Penal Code refer to unnatural offences and acts of gross indecency. In 1995, the section was amended slightly to expressly prohibit "gross indecency" no matter the gender of the participants.

Section 365 
Section 365 (Penal Code 1883) states:

Section 365A 
Section 365A (Penal Code 1883) states:

Section 399 
This section is often used against transgender people for purported "gender impersonation". It has been used in situations where a person has converted to another gender yet bears a different gender on their documentation. The section provides: "a person is said to 'cheat by personation' if he cheats by pretending to be some other person, or by knowingly substituting one person for another, or representing that he or any other person is a person other than he or such other person really is."

Supreme Court 
In a decision of Supreme Court of Sri Lanka, Luwihare, PC. J wrote in his opinion: "This offence deals with the offences of sodomy and buggery which were a part of the law in England and is based on public morality. The Sexual Offence Act repealed the sexual offences of gross indecency and buggery in 2004 and [is] not an offence in England now." Further, the opinion recognised that: The Constitution of Sri Lanka prohibits the Supreme Court from striking down Article 365A because the Constitution does not provide the Supreme Court with the power of judicial review. The second republican constitution was amended to state "all bills passed in parliament shall become law after it receives the Speaker's Certificate (79), it will be final and cannot be questioned in any court of law (80.3)".

In 2017, the Supreme Court had opinionated that it would be inappropriate to impose custodial sentences on people who were accused of engaging in homosexual sex.

Government 
Both the socialist government of Rajapaska and the conservative government of Sirisena have stated that "discrimination against LGBT people was unconstitutional and that the application of sections 365 and 365A in a manner that was discriminatory against LGBT persons was unconstitutional".

In November 2017, Deputy Solicitor General Nerin Pulle stated that the government would move to decriminalize same-sex sexual activity. The country's constitution does not provide the Supreme Court the powers to completely expel a law from the books. An attempt by the government to include its repeal into the human rights action plan was prevented by opposition from the United People's Freedom Alliance.

1841 Vagrants Ordinance 
This act criminalizes soliciting and acts of indecency in public places. Section 7 is being used against sex workers and sexual minorities. A maximum term of six months and a fine of 100 rupees is imposed as punishment.

2023 repeal of Article 365 
Premnath C. Dolawatte of the ruling nationalist Sri Lanka Podujana Peramuna political party submitted a Private Member Bill to Parliament on the 23rd August 2022 aiming to repeal the colonial-era law banning homosexual sex. 

The current President of Sri Lanka Ranil Wickremesinghe said "we are for it" and his government would not oppose the private members bill, but that "you have to get the support of individual members [for the bill to pass in parliament]. It’s a matter of their private conscience."

It was reported by media that the law is likely to be repealed in 2023 due to the cause gaining widespread consensus among said individual members of parliament.

Recognition of same-sex relationships
Sri Lankan family law does not recognize same-sex marriages, same-sex civil unions, or provide equal rights to same-sex live-in couples.

Marriage was not legally recognized in pre-colonial Sri Lanka, when the predominant form of kinship was what is now called as "living together" or cohabiting live-in couples. As in India, the aim of the colonial laws were to codify marriage arrangements for the purpose of administrating divorce proceedings

Discrimination protections

Constitutional protections 
The government of Sri Lanka claimed to the United Nations Human Rights Committee on 7–8 October 2014 that they think sexual minorities should be protected under existing generic anti-discrimination laws provided in the Constitution. The government of Sri Lanka stated that such protections were "'implicit'" in the Sri Lankan constitution and that the government has not written a law giving 'explicit' rights yet".

Discrimination against sexual minorities remains a problem. Several lawyers and charities have called for specific wording in the constitution stating that discrimination against sexual minorities is illegal.

Law 
While there is interest in creating non-discrimination laws and there have been at least two legal judgements favourable towards protections, none have been created or passed.

In 2017, the Government announced they would update their Human Rights Action Plan with an addendum that bans discrimination against anyone based on his or her sexual orientation. However, no laws were put in place following this statement.

Both the Nationalist government of Rajapaska and the Conservative government of Sirisena have stated "that discrimination against LGBT people was unconstitutional and that the application of sections 365 and 365A in a manner that was discriminatory against LGBT persons was unconstitutional". The Sri Lankan Supreme Court handed down a judgement in the case of Officer-in-Charge, Police Station, Maradana v Wimalasiri and Jeganathan, in which sections 365 and 365A were deemed unenforceable under the constitution. Despite this judgement and the government statements, the only parliamentary effort to repeal the laws criminalizing homosexual acts was not passed. , no further attempts to repeal the laws have been put before Cabinet or introduced in the legislature.

Legal action challenging prejudicial police training
In November 2021, Equal Ground (a long-established LGBTQI rights advocacy organisation), with others, filed a petition at the Court of Appeal seeking a Writ of Prohibition against the training programme for the police where "malicious, erroneous, and discriminatory remarks" were made about LGBTIQ persons. The Court of Appeal decided on 8 December 2021, that this petition could proceed.

Gender identity and expression

Recognition of gender identity
Transgender persons may change legal gender. This has been allowed since 2016, following advice from the Human Rights Commission of Sri Lanka. The Commission's advice elicited a directive to agencies from the Ministry of Health. The legal change requires bureaucratic certification which may be onerous to achieve; while typically requiring medical intervention and vetting before being permitted, the international legal charity,  point out there is no legal requirement in Sri Lanka for any surgical intervention. This has been confirmed in a legal ruling.

According to a United Nations Development Programme (UNDP) report: 

Although performed on occasion, gender-confirming surgery is relatively inaccessible within Sri Lanka, as many hospitals lack the highly specialised surgical units and staff. Human Rights Watch (HRW), in its "All Five Fingers are Not the Same" report (2016), interviewed doctors and patients. One physician who treats transgender individuals told HRW that Sri Lankan doctors were often unfamiliar with surgical treatments of transgender patients. Patients who had experienced gender-confirming treatments in Sri Lanka, reported that they could be met with ignorance, curiosity and even ridicule from medical staff. Some avoided public hospitals and clinics due such experiences, thus increasing the costs of treatments. Obtaining hormone therapy is similarly fraught. Such obstacles in the path of gender-confirmation increases the difficulty of obtaining any legal gender recognition. Besides providing a legal procedure for gender recognition, there is no other government recognition or assistance for transgender people.

Classification as mental illness 
Gender dysphoria is classified as a mental health disorder or illness. Sexual and romantic orientations are not classified as mental illness by either the Sri Lanka College of Psychiatrists, or the College of Community Physicians. Despite this, and that all medical practitioners in Sri Lanka are members professional colleges, and all Sri Lankan colleges are signatories to the WHO code of ethics—which deprecates any treatment of homosexuality as a disease or illness, on scientific and ethical grounds—doctors are often sought out by families to administer "treatment" to their LGBTQI members. There are sufficient doctors willing to perform such treatments that it is reported as a regular occurrence.

Third gender 
The concept of third gender is not recognized under Sri Lankan law.

Blood donation 
The National Blood Transfusion Service (NBTS) bans people who engage in risky behavior from donating blood. It classifies male same-sex intercourse as a risky behavior, along with unrelated behaviors such as drug use and having more than one sexual partner. Consequently, men who engage in anal sex with men are banned from donating blood through the NBTS.

Summary table

See also

 Human rights in Sri Lanka
 LGBT rights in Asia
 Homosexuality in Sri Lanka
 Sexual minorities in Sri Lanka
 Tamil sexual minorities

References

External links
 Sri Lankan Gay Community forum
 Equal Ground
 RESPONSES TO INFORMATION REQUESTS (RIRs) in 2008
 

LGBT rights in Sri Lanka
Law of Sri Lanka